Isom is a surname. Notable people with the name include:

 Anne Williams-Isom (born 1967), American government official, academic, lawyer, and nonprofit executive
 Cedric Isom (born 1984), American-Rwandan basketball player 

 Daniel Isom (born 1967), American academic and police officer
Harriet Winsar Isom (born 1936), American foreign service officer
Lori L. Isom, American pharmacologist 
 Mary Frances Isom (1865–1920), American librarian
 Mike Isom (born 1948), American football coach
 Mo Isom (born 1989), American soccer player
 Ray Isom (born 1965), American football player
 Rickey Isom (born 1963), American football player
 Sarah McGehee Isom (1854–1905), American orator